Thendral Veesum is a 1962 Indian Tamil language film produced and directed by B. S. Ranga. The film stars Kalyan Kumar, M. R. Radha, Krishna Kumari and Rajasree. The film was simultaneously produced in Telugu with the title Aasa Jeevulu.

Plot

Cast 
The list was adapted from K. Neelamegam's Thiraikalanjiyam Part2.

Kalyan Kumar
M. R. Radha
A. Karunanidhi
Prem Nazir
S. Rama Rao
V. Nagayya
Krishna Kumari
Rajasree
Rukmini

Production 
The film was simultaneously produced in Telugu with the title Aasa Jeevulu. The song Paadinaar Kavignar Paadinaar was recorded for Nichaya Thaamboolam with Sivaji Ganesan and Jamuna featuring in the scene. But that was not included in the film for some reason. B. S. Ranga who was the producer and director for that film as well, used the song in this film.

Soundtrack 
Music was composed by the duo Viswanathan–Ramamoorthy while the lyrics were penned by Kannadasan and P. Mayavanathan. Playback singers are P. Susheela, T. M. Soundararajan, S. Janaki, G. K. Venkatesh, P. B. Srinivas, S. C. Krishnan and L. R. Eswari. The song Aambala Manasu Aasaiyinaale Aaduthu sung by S. C. Krishnan and L. R. Eswari was recorded in the disc but was not included in the film.

References

External links 
 

1962 drama films
1962 films
Films scored by Viswanathan–Ramamoorthy
Indian drama films
Indian multilingual films
1960s multilingual films
1960s Telugu-language films
1960s Tamil-language films